Dainelky Pérez Sánchez (born 6 January 1976) is a Cuban sprinter. She competed in the women's 4 × 100 metres relay at the 1996 Summer Olympics.

References

1976 births
Living people
Athletes (track and field) at the 1996 Summer Olympics
Cuban female sprinters
Olympic athletes of Cuba
Place of birth missing (living people)
Pan American Games medalists in athletics (track and field)
Pan American Games silver medalists for Cuba
Athletes (track and field) at the 1995 Pan American Games
Athletes (track and field) at the 2003 Pan American Games
Medalists at the 1995 Pan American Games
Medalists at the 2003 Pan American Games
Central American and Caribbean Games medalists in athletics
Olympic female sprinters
20th-century Cuban women